Renkovci is a village in the Municipality of Turnišče in the Prekmurje region of northeastern Slovenia.

References

External links
Renkovci on Geopedia

Populated places in the Municipality of Turnišče